Don't Let It Go to Your Head may refer to:

"Don't Let It Go to Your Head" (Chantay Savage song), 1994
"Don't Let It Go to Your Head" (Fefe Dobson song), 2005
"Don't Let It Go to Your Head" (Jean Carne song), 1978; covered by Brand New Heavies (1992) and Brand Nubian (1998)
"Don't Let It Go to Your Head", a song by Nat King Cole from After Midnight, 1957